Tayyab Hussain (Urdu: طیب حسین) is the current Mayor of Hyderabad and ex- parliamentarian from the MQM of Pakistan. He is an Engineer by profession.

National Assembly of Pakistan 
Tayyab Hussain served as MQM's Parliamentarian from the constituency of NA-219 Hyderabad in 2008 - 2013.

Mayor of Hyderabad 
In 2016 Tayyab Hussain became the next Mayor of Hyderabad by overwhelming votes. He was elected as the next Hyderabad mayor after a gap of six years. He took oath as Mayor of Hyderabad on August 30, 2016.

See also 
 Mayor of Hyderabad
 NA 219 Hyderabad
 Khalid Maqbool Siddqui

References 

Mayors of Hyderabad, Sindh
Muhajir people
Politicians from Hyderabad, Sindh
Living people
Muttahida Qaumi Movement politicians
Muttahida Qaumi Movement MNAs
Year of birth missing (living people)
NED University of Engineering & Technology alumni
Pakistani MNAs 2008–2013